The 2014–15 BBL season was the 28th campaign of the British Basketball League since the league's establishment in 1987. The season featured 13 teams from across England and Scotland, including new entrants, Bristol Flyers and Leeds Force. The season started on 26 September 2014 and ended on 10 May 2015 with the Play-off Final at The O2 Arena.

As they did in 2005–06 and 2011–12, Newcastle Eagles completed a clean sweep of honours available during the season. After a 31–5 regular season campaign – which ensured the Championship and top seeding for the play-offs – the Eagles then defeated Bristol Flyers and Sheffield Sharks to make the final, which they then won 96–84 over London Lions. The Eagles also won the BBL Cup in January against Glasgow Rocks, and the BBL Trophy in March against Leicester Riders.

Teams

BBL Championship (Tier 1)

Regular season

Standings

Results

Playoffs

Bracket

Quarter-finals
(1) Newcastle Eagles vs. (8) Bristol Flyers

(2) Leicester Riders vs. (7) Sheffield Sharks

(3) Worcester Wolves vs. (6) London Lions

(4) Cheshire Phoenix vs. (5) Glasgow Rocks

Semi-finals
(1) Newcastle Eagles vs. (7) Sheffield Sharks

(4) Cheshire Phoenix vs. (6) London Lions

Final
(1) Newcastle Eagles vs. (6) London Lions

EBL National League Division 1 (Tier 2)

Final standings

EBL National League Division 2 (Tier 3)

Final standings

BBL Cup
The winners of the five 1st Round matches will be joined by Newcastle Eagles, Worcester Wolves and Sheffield Sharks in the Quarter-finals, who received byes for finishing in the top three BBL Championship positions last season. The Final will be played on 11 January 2015 at the National Indoor Arena in Birmingham.

1st round

Quarter-finals

Semi-finals
Sheffield Sharks vs. Newcastle Eagles

Bristol Flyers vs. Glasgow Rocks

Final

BBL Trophy
The 13 BBL clubs will joined by Essex Leopards and Reading Rockets of the English Basketball League and Falkirk Fury of the Scottish Basketball League to form a straight knock-out competition. The first two rounds featured one-off games whilst the Semi-finals took place over two legs. The Final will be held at the Emirates Arena in Glasgow on 8 March 2015, and will be the third consecutive year that the venue has hosted the event.

1st round

Quarter-finals

Semi-finals
Newcastle Eagles vs. Plymouth Raiders

Leicester Riders vs. London Lions

Final

Monthly awards

References

British Basketball League seasons
1
British